Lecanora kohu is a species of lichen in the family Lecanoraceae. Found in the Chatham Islands of New Zealand, it was formally described as new to science in 2017.

It is similar in morphology to Lecanora symmicta, from which it is distinguished by the continuous, areolate thallus, immersed apothecia with pale pink to pink-brown discs, and by the presence of atranorin and psoromic acid rather than usnic acid, zeorin and xanthones in the thallus.

See also
List of Lecanora species

References

kohu
Lichen species
Lichens described in 2017
Lichens of New Zealand